Princes Town is a region of Trinidad and Tobago.  The local government body is Princes Town Regional Corporation, a Regional Corporation of Trinidad and Tobago. The region has a land area of 620 km2. The Princes Town Regional Corporation is headquartered in Princes Town.

Electoral Districts in Princes Town Regional Corporation are:

 Ben Lomond/Hardbargain/Williamsville
 Corinth/Cedar Hill
 Fifth Company
 Hindustan/St. Marys
 Inverness/Princes Town South
 Lengua/Indian Walk
 Moruga
 New Grant/Tableland
 Reform/Manahambre
 St. Juliens/Princes Town North

It falls within the constituencies of Naparima, Princes Town, Moruga/Tableland and San Fernando East.

References

External links 
 Official Website of the Princes Town Regional Corporation

Regions of Trinidad and Tobago
Trinidad (island)